Retting is a process employing the action of micro-organisms and moisture on plants to dissolve or rot away much of the cellular tissues and pectins surrounding bast-fibre bundles, and so facilitating separation of the fibre from the stem. It is used in the production of linen from flax stalks and coir from coconut husks.

Water retting
The most widely practiced method of retting, water retting, is performed by submerging bundles of stalks in water. The water, penetrating to the central stalk portion, swells the inner cells, bursting the outermost layer, thus increasing absorption of both moisture and decay-producing bacteria. Retting time must be carefully judged; under-retting makes separation difficult, and over-retting weakens the fibre. In double retting, a gentle process producing excellent fibre, the stalks are removed from the water before retting is completed, dried for several months, then retted again.

Natural water retting employs stagnant or slow-moving waters, such as ponds, bogs, and slow streams and rivers. The stalk bundles are weighted down, usually with stones or wood, for about 8 to 14 days, depending upon water temperature and mineral content.

Tank retting, by contrast, employs vats usually made of concrete, requires about four to six days, and is feasible in any season. In the first six to eight hours, called the leaching period, much of the dirt and colouring matter is removed by the water, which is usually changed to assure clean fibre. Waste retting water, which requires treatment to reduce harmful toxic elements before its release, is rich in plant minerals, such as nitrates, and can be used as liquid fertilizer.

Dew retting

This is a common method in areas with limited water resources. It is most effective in climates with heavy night time dews and warm daytime temperatures. The harvested plant stalks are spread evenly in grassy fields, where the combined action of bacteria, sun, air, and dew produces fermentation, dissolving much of the stem material surrounding the fibre bundles. Within two to three weeks, depending upon climatic conditions, the fibre can be separated. Dew-retted fibre is generally darker in color and of poorer quality than water-retted fibre.

After retting 

The retted stalks, called straw, are dried in open air or by mechanical means, and are frequently stored for a short period to allow "curing" to occur, facilitating fibre removal. Final separation of the fibre is accomplished by a breaking process in which the brittle woody portion of the straw is broken, either by hand or by passing through rollers, followed by the scutching operation, which removes the broken woody pieces (shives) by beating or scraping. Some machines combine breaking and scutching operations. Waste material from the first scutching, consisting of shives and short fibres, is usually treated a second time. The short fibre or tow thus obtained is frequently used in paper manufacture, and the shives may serve as fuel to heat the retting water or may be made into wallboard and to make rope.

See also
Textile manufacture during the Industrial Revolution
Timeline of clothing and textiles technology
Cottonization

References

External links

Video footage of the Low House retting pond

Textile arts
Hemp